The consensus 1966 College Basketball All-American team, as determined by aggregating the results of four major All-American teams.  To earn "consensus" status, a player must win honors from a majority of the following teams: the Associated Press, the USBWA, The United Press International and the National Association of Basketball Coaches.

1966 Consensus All-America team

Individual All-America teams

AP Honorable Mention:

 Cliff Anderson, Saint Joseph's
 John Austin, Boston College
 John Beasley, Texas A&M
 John Block, USC
 Nate Branch, Nebraska
 Jerry Chambers, Utah
 Archie Clark, Minnesota
 Leon Clark, Wyoming
 Jim Coleman, Loyola (Illinois)
 Mel Daniels, New Mexico
 Ollie Darden, Michigan
 Lee DeFore, Auburn
 Sonny Dove, St. John's
 Joe Ellis, San Francisco
 Donnie Freeman, Illinois
 Clem Haskins, Western Kentucky
 Elvin Hayes, Houston
 Lou Hudson, Minnesota
 Edgar Lacy, UCLA
 Bob Leonard, Wake Forest
 Dub Malaise, Texas Tech
 Don May, Dayton
 Bill Melchionni, Villanova
 Dorie Murrey, Detroit Mercy
 Dick Nemelka, Brigham Young
 Loy Petersen, Oregon State
 Don Rolfes, Cincinnati
 Nevil Shed, UTEP
 Mike Silliman, Army
 Wes Unseld, Louisville
 Steve Vacendak, Duke
 Jim Ware, Oklahoma City
 Michael Warren, UCLA
 Stan Washington, Michigan State

See also
 1965–66 NCAA University Division men's basketball season

References

NCAA Men's Basketball All-Americans
All-Americans